Erbessa tegyroides is a moth of the family Notodontidae first described by James S. Miller in 2008. It is found in south-eastern Peru.

The length of the forewings is 12 mm for males and 13.5–14 mm for females. The ground color of the forewings is dark brown to blackish brown, while the ground color of the hindwings is blackish brown, but slightly lighter near the base.

The larvae feed on Miconia species.

Etymology
This species name was chosen to reflect the remarkable similarity between females of E. tegyroides and the josiine Proutiella tegyra.

References

Moths described in 2008
Notodontidae of South America